Shivaji (12 May 1957 - 30 September 2004) was an Indian actor, most popular for his Malayalam films during the 1980s and 1990s. He mainly did villain roles.

Background
Shivaji was born at Sankaramangalam Pattambi, Palakkad as the fourth child of (both late) Dr. A.K. Warrier (Panjal Ayyappankavu Variam) and Kamalam Varasyar (Manissery Thekkeppattu Variam). His debut movie was Kaaliyamarddanam in 1982.  He did many notable roles in TV dramas and soap operas. He acted in more than 100 films. He died on 30 September 2004 following cardiac arrest at Thiruvananthapuram. He is survived by his daughter Unnimaya,  his mother (who died on 9 August 2010) and his wife (who died in 2017).

Filmography

1980s

1990s

2000s

Television
Chila Kudumba Chithrangal (Kairali TV)

References

External links
 
 Shivaji at MSI

Indian male film actors
Male actors from Palakkad
Male actors in Malayalam cinema
20th-century Indian male actors
21st-century Indian male actors
1957 births
2004 deaths
People from Palakkad district